Robert Norman "Bob" Forhan (March 27, 1936 – June 3, 2018) was a Canadian ice hockey right winger who competed in the 1960 Winter Olympics and 1964 Winter Olympics.

Early years and hockey career
Born in Newmarket, Ontario, Forhan won a silver medal at the 1960 Winter Olympics in ice hockey. He finished fourth at the 1964 Winter Olympics in ice hockey.

Forhan played for the Guelph Biltmores, Sudbury Wolves, Greensboro Generals, Cleveland Barons.

Post-hockey career
After his playing career Forhan became a high school teacher and then embarked on a political career from the 1970s to 1996: on Newmarket Town Council (as Town Councillor and then Mayor from 1971 to 1978), Chair of York Region (1978-1984) and Chief Administrative Officer of York Region from 1978 to 1995.

In 2010 he was one of the 7 "inaugural inductees to the Newmarket Sports Hall of Fame." He died on June 3, 2018 at the age of 82.

References

External links

sports-reference

1936 births
2018 deaths
Canadian ice hockey right wingers
Ice hockey players at the 1960 Winter Olympics
Ice hockey players at the 1964 Winter Olympics
Mayors of Newmarket, Ontario
Medalists at the 1960 Winter Olympics
Olympic ice hockey players of Canada
Olympic medalists in ice hockey
Olympic silver medalists for Canada
Sportspeople from Newmarket, Ontario
Sportspeople from Ontario